The following is a list of the MTV Europe Music Award winners and nominees for Best Brazilian Act.

Winners and nominees
Winners are listed first and highlighted in bold.

2010s

2020s

References

See also 
 MTV Video Music Brazil
 MTV VMA International Viewer's Choice Award for MTV Brasil

Brazilian Act
Brazil music-related lists
Awards established in 2012